This is a list of international rankings of Colombia.

Crime and Safety 
United States of America OSAC Safety and Crime report classified Colombia 2015 rating risk as high.

Demographics
 

Immigrant population ranked 112 most immigrants
Population ranked 27

Economy

World Bank List of countries by GDP (nominal) ranked 35th biggest economy in the world

Environment

Happy Planet Index (HPI) ranked 3 in 2012 and 2016

Health

List of countries by life expectancy ranked 35th longest life expectancy in the world

Human development

List of countries by Human Development Index 2007, ranked 77th highest Human Development in the world

Politics

 Fund For Peace 2016 ranked 67 out of 178 and 2010 Failed States Index ranked 46
Transparency International 2016 ranked 90th out of 176 and in 2009 Corruption Perceptions Index ranked 75
Reporters Without Borders 2016 Press Freedom Index ranked 134 and 2012 Press Freedom Index ranked 129

Society

 Economist Intelligence Unit 2005 Quality-of-life index ranked 54
 University of Leicester 2006 Satisfaction with Life Index ranked 34
Suicide rate ranked 73 most suicides
Beer consumption per capita ranked 35
2008 Coffee consumption per capita ranked 58

Tourism

World Economic Forum 2009 Travel and Tourism Competitiveness Report ranked 72

See also 

Outline of Colombia
Index of Colombia-related articles

References

Colombia